The Ohio State University College of Dentistry is one of the graduate and professional schools of The Ohio State University.  The college is the fourth largest public dental school in the U.S. and consists of nine academic divisions representing all major dental specialties. In addition to the Doctor of Dental Surgery (D.D.S.) and Bachelor of Science in Dental Hygiene degrees, the Ohio State College of Dentistry offers specialty training programs, advanced training programs, MS programs, and a Ph.D. program in Oral Biology. Outreach and Engagement activities include over 60 active programs and more than 42 extramural sites, which continue to expand.

Graduate programs
The College of Dentistry offers formal graduate programs leading to a Certificate, Masters (M.S.), and/or a Ph.D. in the following areas:
 Dental Anesthesiology
 Endodontics
 General Practice Residency
 Oral and Maxillofacial Pathology
 Oral and Maxillofacial Surgery
 Orthodontics
 Pediatric Dentistry
 Periodontics
 Prosthodontics
 PhD in Oral Biology
 Master of Dental Hygiene

Research
The College of Dentistry receives extensive support from the National Institutes of Health and the National Science Foundation. Students and faculty members participate in both clinical and laboratory research. Faculty researchers have expertise in such fields as: gum disease (gingivitis and periodontitis), tooth decay (caries), tooth stain, plaque, and dentin hypersensitivity (pain). A research-focused combined D.D.S./Ph.D. degree program is also available.

Clinics
The Ohio State Dental Clinics offer primary care and a full range of specialty clinics all in one building. The Dental Emergency Care Clinic is also available as a walk-in only service available to adult patients older than age 18. Emergency care is provided by third- and fourth-year dental students under the supervision of college faculty.

Special events
Reunion Weekend, usually held in late September to coincide with Ohio State's homecoming football game, features class reunions and an alumni tailgate averaging 500–600 in attendance.

White Coat Ceremony held in late August, is a 1st-year orientation and welcome event for dental and dental hygiene students.

Distinguished Lecture Series is held annually in October, and features a distinguished guest lecturer of national repute, primarily in the field of oral health research

Post College Assembly is held annually at the end of April or first week of May. This is an annual continuing education and alumni event.

Notable alumni
Gerald M. Bowers, D.D.S., M.S., '62, A pioneering researcher in periodontal regeneration
Les Horvath - Heisman Trophy winner D.D.S., 1945 
Neil Luyk, Chair Oral and Maxillofacial Surgery Middlemore Hospital New Zealand, M.S. and Cert OMS '87
Laurie McCauley, D.D.S., M.S., Ph.D., The William K. and Mary Anne Najjar Professor and chair, Department of Periodontics and Oral Medicine University of Michigan School of Dentistry, D.D.S. '85, M.S. '88
Abdel Rahim Mohammad, DDS, MS, MPH, FAAOM, FACD, Clinical Professor of Geriatrics, College of Dentistry at The Ohio State University 
Joel Milton Weaver, D.D.S., Ph.D., R.Ph., OSU Professor Emeritus of Anesthesiology, D.D.S. '72
Gordon J. McCarthy D.D.S. ‘04, Featured in 2012 Incisal Edge’s Top 40 Dentists Under 40 in America

History
In 1825, John Harris, a physician in the Ohio town of Bainbridge, provided medical and dental care for the community. He decided to share his dental experiences with other physicians in southern Ohio. His “school” for dental training yielded two colleagues, each of whom was a co-founder of one of the first two formal dental colleges in the world: The Baltimore College of Dental Surgery in 1840 and the Ohio College of Dental Surgery in Cincinnati in 1845.

The Ohio Medical University (OMU), founded in 1890 in Columbus, opened its doors on September 7, 1892. It was located on Park Street across from Goodale Park. It was a venture to bring health care to people in the north side of the city.

Starling Ohio Medical College
OMU flourished and in 1907 it merged with the Starling Medical College to become the STARLING OHIO MEDICAL COLLEGE (SOMC). The "colleges" became "departments" again.
In 1912, the Ohio General Assembly passed Senate Bill 120. This authorized Ohio State University to "create, establish, provide for, and maintain in said University a College of Medicine and a College of Dentistry."

The Ohio State University College of Dentistry on Park Street
In 1913, a proposal was made to merge the Starling Ohio Medical College with Ohio State University. On July 1 of 1914, The Ohio State University Board of Trustees officially acquired the properties of the SOMC. Classes for the Ohio State College of Dentistry began on September 21, 1914, and graduation of its first class was held in the spring of 1915.

The Theta Chapter of Omicron Kappa Upsilon, the national dental honorary society, was chartered at Ohio State in May 1916.
When Ohio State acquired its dental school in 1914, four years of high school and a diploma were the only requirements for admission and the dental curriculum lasted just three years. For the entering class of 1916, the curriculum was expanded to four years. By 1921, one year of college was required for admission, and in 1928 a minimum of two years was imposed.

The Ohio State University College of Dentistry in Hamilton Hall
In 1925, the Colleges of Medicine and Dentistry moved on campus to Hamilton Hall. Dentistry was located on the third and fourth floors in the north wing. The fourth floor held the main clinic and was two stories high. The roof contained skylights to enhance the light in the clinic. (When the sun is directed to the roof, one can still see a difference in the roof tiles indicating where the skylights were once positioned.)

The Ohio State University College of Dentistry in Postle Hall

In 1951, the college moved to a new building north of Hamilton Hall.

College of Dentistry Leadership

Dr. Harry M. Semans 1906 - 1938
Dr. Wendell D. Postle 1938 - 1964
Dr. John Wilson 1965 - 1974
Dr. Charles Howell 1975 - 1980
Dr. William Wallace 1980 - 1990
Dr. Henry Fields 1991 - 2001
Dr. Jan Kronmiller 2001 - 2006
Dr. Carole Anderson 2006 – 2011
Dr. Patrick Lloyd 2011–2021
Dr. Carroll Ann Trotman 2021–Present

Accreditation 
The Ohio State University College of Dentistry academic programs are accredited by the American Dental Association (ADA) through their Commission on Dental Accreditation (CODA).

Incidents 
On July 8, 2002, the National Dental Board Part I exams were stolen by an unknown perpetrator.  Several media outlets became aware of the situation and were interviewing dental students outside of Postle Hall.  A thorough investigation by the campus police and administration did not yield any results.

The exam from the prior year was successfully administered on Friday July 12, 2002.  The students were compensated with free pizza for lunch.

See also

American Student Dental Association

References

External links
College of Dentistry

Dentistry, The Ohio State University College of
Dentistry, The Ohio State University College of
Dental schools in Ohio
1914 establishments in Ohio